Torojoatngna ("the place below Joat" or "the place below snowy mountain") was a Tongva village located in what is now Claremont, California. The name of the village referred the place below Mount San Antonio as the place of snow. Archaeological investigations in the Claremont area have found evidence of village artifacts near the Indian Hill area of the city, located near the Rancho Santa Ana Botanic Gardens.

References 

Tongva populated places
Former Native American populated places in California
Former settlements in Los Angeles County, California
Claremont, California